The 1984–85 season was Liverpool Football Club's 93rd season in existence and their 23rd consecutive season in the First Division. As European champions, Liverpool took part in the 1984 Intercontinental Cup in December 1984 against Independiente in Tokyo, where they lost 1–0.

Liverpool reached the 1985 European Cup Final where they faced Juventus. They lost the match 1–0, but the game was overshadowed by crowd trouble where thirty-nine Juventus fans died. Just hours before the match, Liverpool manager Joe Fagan had announced he would retire at the end of the season

Squad

Goalkeepers
  Bob Bolder
  Bruce Grobbelaar
  Chris Pile

Defenders
  Jim Beglin
  Gary Gillespie
  Alan Hansen
  Alan Kennedy
  Mark Lawrenson
  John McGregor
  Phil Neal

Midfielders
  Kenny Dalglish
  Craig Johnston
  Sammy Lee
  Kevin MacDonald
  Jan Mølby
  Steve Nicol
  John Wark
  Ronnie Whelan

Attackers
  David Hodgson
  Michael Robinson
  Ian Rush
  Paul Walsh
  David West

League table

Results

First Division

FA Charity Shield

FA Cup

League Cup

European Cup

Final

Intercontinental Cup

European Super Cup

Notes

References
LFC History.net – Games for the 1984–85 season
Liverweb - Games for the 1984–85 season

Liverpool F.C. seasons
Liverpool